Orania archaea is a species of sea snail, a marine gastropod mollusk in the family Muricidae, the murex snails or rock snails.

Subspecies
 Orania archaea archaea Houart, 1995
 Orania archaea hitomiae Houart & Moe, 2011 (occurs off Oahu, Hawaii).

Description

Distribution
This marine species occurs off the Philippines.

References

 Houart, R.; Gori, S. & Rosado, J. (2017). The Muricidae (Gastropoda: Muricoidea) from Oman with the description of four new species. Novapex. 18 (3): 41-69.
 Houart, R. & Moe, C., 2011 Description of Orania archaea hitomiae n. ssp. (Gastropoda: Muricidae: Ergalataxinae) from Hawaii in Severns, M

External links
 Houart, R. (1995). The Ergalataxinae (Gastropoda, Muricidae) from the New Caledonia region with some comments on the subfamily and the description of thirteen new species from the Indo-West Pacific. Bulletin du Muséum National d'Histoire Naturelle, Paris. ser. 4, 16 (A, 2-4): 245-297

Gastropods described in 1995
Orania (gastropod)